Agrippinus was the one of the earliest known bishops of Carthage around the 230s. During his episcopacy, he dealt with the issue of how to treat Christian converts from schism or heresy.  He called a synod of bishops of Numidia and Africa, probably around 230–235, which decided that such converts should be fully baptized.

Subsequently, St. Cyprian would mention the positive reputation of Agrippinus (bonæ memoriæ vir).

St. Augustine, in his arguments against the Donatists, would remark that Agrippinus and Cyprian maintained the unity of the church despite being doctrinally mistaken.

References

3rd-century Christian saints
3rd-century bishops of Carthage